Bidogno was a municipality in the district of Lugano, in the canton of Ticino in Switzerland.

Coat of arms
The municipality's coat of arms was: Gules a he-goat sable passant and in base two ears of oat issuant.

References

External links
 Official website 
 

Former municipalities of Ticino